Air Marshal Michael Akuoko Otu (25 October 25, 1925 – 8 October 2006) was a senior commander in the Ghana Air Force who served as Chief of Air Staff and then Chief of Defence Staff of the Ghana Armed Forces.

Honours
July 2006 - Order of the Star of Ghana

References

1925 births
2006 deaths
Ghana Air Force air marshals
Ghanaian soldiers
Recipients of the Order of the Star of Ghana
Chiefs of Naval Staff (Ghana)